Qau or QAU may be,

 Qau language
 Quaid-i-Azam University